Walter Hutchinson may refer to:
 Walter Hely-Hutchinson, Anglo-Irish diplomat and colonial administrator
 Walter Victor Hutchinson, British publisher